The German Football League 2 (GFL2) is the second tier of American football in Germany, below the German Football League. Until 2007, the league was known as the 2. Bundesliga.

League structure
The GFL2, formerly the 2. Bundesliga, which was formed in 1982, is divided into a northern and southern division, with eight teams in each division. Unlike the GFL, there are no inter conference games and no GFL2 champion is determined.

For the 2011 season, both the northern and the southern champions were promoted, while the runners-up of the two divisions played the last placed team in the GFL division above for another spot in the league in 2012. Since then the two division champions play a home-and-away series for a place each in the northern and southern division of the GFL.

Below the GFL2, six Regionalligas, Regional Leagues, are set, North, South, West, Central, East and Southwest. Four teams each are promoted each season from the Regionalliga to the GFL2. However, additional spots may become available if teams resign from either the GFL or the GFL2.

Promotion to the GFL2 is achieved through a promotion round at the end of the Regionalliga season which includes the best Regionalliga teams. For the southern division of the GFL2 the champions of the southern, southwestern and central division and for the northern GFL2 division the champions of the Regionalliga divisions north, west and east play each other once to determine the two promoted teams.

League history
The league was formed as the 2nd American Football Bundesliga in 1982, consisting of 16 clubs in three regional divisions. League strength varied from season to season after this, but the three division format was retained until 1986, when a fourth regional group was added.

In 1995, the league was reduced to two divisions with seven clubs each. The strength was increased to eight teams per division in 1998 but continued to fluctuate because of teams withdrawing.

Promotion to the GFL2 is achieved through the promotion round of the best Regionalliga clubs whereby the champions from the south plays the runners-up from central division and the champions from central the runners-up from the south. The winners of these two contests earn a place in the southern division of the GFL2 for the following season. In the north the champions Of the Regionalliga divisions North,

GFL2 Teams in 2022

GFL2 North

GFL2 South

GFL2 season placings
The placings in the league since 2000:

North

 In the 2000, 2001 and 2006 seasons, only seven clubs played in the league.
 In the 2002 and 2011 seasons, only six clubs played in the league.
 In the 2003 season, only five clubs played in the league.
 1 Played as the Hamburg Wild Huskies until 2003, then as the Hamburg Eagles from 2004 to 2009 before becoming the Hamburg Huskies from 2010.

South

 In the 2003 and 2004 seasons, only seven clubs played in the league.
 In the 2001 season, only six clubs played in the league.
 1 Played as the Simbach Wildcats until 2003.

Divisional champions
The winners of the regional divisions of the GFL:

References

External links
  German Football League official website
  German American Football Association website
  Football History Historic American football tables from Germany

American football leagues in Germany
1982 establishments in Germany
Sports leagues established in 1982
American football leagues in Europe
Professional sports leagues in Germany